WLEW-FM (102.1 FM) is a radio station in Bad Axe, Michigan, serving the Thumb area of Michigan, United States.  It is owned by Thumb Broadcasting and broadcasts from studios on South Van Dyke Road in Bad Axe.  Unusual for small-town radio stations, WLEW-FM is locally programmed and does not rely on satellite feeds for any of their music programming.

WLEW-FM, known as "Cruise 102.1" ("The Thumb's Power Station"), broadcasts at 102.1 MHz FM with 50,000 watts of power.  The station's adult hits format is a combination of classic hits and adult contemporary titles from the 1960s through the present.  WLEW-FM was formerly a 3,000-watt easy listening music station at 92.1 until it changed frequencies and boosted its power in the late 1980s (with WIDL in Caro, which had been at 104.9, taking the 92.1 frequency).

Sources
Michiguide.com - WLEW-FM History

External links

LEW-FM
Classic hits radio stations in the United States
Radio stations established in 1967
1967 establishments in Michigan